The enzyme D-fuconate dehydratase catalyzes the chemical reaction.

D-fuconate  2-dehydro-3-deoxy-D-fuconate + H2O

This enzyme belongs to the family of lyases, specifically the hydro-lyases, which cleave carbon-oxygen bonds.  The systematic name of this enzyme class is D-fuconate hydro-lyase (2-dehydro-3-deoxy-D-fuconate-forming). This enzyme is also called D-fuconate hydro-lyase.  This enzyme participates in fructose and mannose metabolism.

References

 

EC 4.2.1
Enzymes of unknown structure